Eucithara angela is a small sea snail, a marine gastropod mollusk in the family Mangeliidae.

Description
The length of the ovate-fusiform shell varies between 10 mm and 16 mm.

The color of the shell is yellowish white, chocolate-tinted towards the base. The narrow aperture is stained with violet in front.

Distribution
This marine species occurs off Australia (Queensland) and off Vanuatu.

References

  Adams, A. & Angas, G.F. 1864. Descriptions of new species from Australian seas, in the collection of George French Angas; Proceedings of the Zoological Society of London 1863(III): 418-428, pl. xxxvii 
 Crosse, H. 1873. Diagnoses molluscorum novorum. Journal de Conchyliologie 21: 284-285
 Bouge, L.J. & Dautzenberg, P.L. 1914. Les Pleurotomides de la Nouvelle-Caledonie et de ses dependances. Journal de Conchyliologie 61: 123-214

External links
  Hedley, C. 1922. A revision of the Australian Turridae. Records of the Australian Museum 13(6): 213-359, pls 42-56
  Tucker, J.K. 2004 Catalog of recent and fossil turrids (Mollusca: Gastropoda). Zootaxa 682:1-1295.
 

angela
Gastropods described in 1864